Tibo Juan Chávez (1912 – 1991) was an American attorney, politician, and judge who served as the 15th lieutenant governor of New Mexico. Chávez also served separate terms in the New Mexico Senate.

Education 
Chávez earned a Bachelor of Arts from the University of New Mexico and Bachelor of Laws from the Georgetown University Law Center.

Career 
During World War II, he served in the U.S. Embassy in Chile. Chávez then returned to New Mexico and was elected to the New Mexico Senate in 1948. He served until 1950, after which he was selected to serve as lieutenant governor of New Mexico. In 1954, Chávez was again elected to the New Mexico Senate, serving until 1974. Chávez was a candidate in the 1974 New Mexico gubernatorial election, placing second in Democratic primary. From 1979 until his death in 1991, he served as a district court judge. Chávez also owned a private legal practice, which is still operated by his sons.

After his death, Chávez's papers were donated to the University of New Mexico–Valencia Campus in Los Lunas, New Mexico.

See also 
 List of minority governors and lieutenant governors in the United States

References 

1912 births
1991 deaths
Lieutenant Governors of New Mexico
20th-century American politicians
Democratic Party New Mexico state senators
New Mexico lawyers
University of New Mexico alumni
Georgetown University Law Center alumni
Hispanic and Latino American state legislators in New Mexico
New Mexico state court judges
20th-century American lawyers
20th-century American judges